Forlaget Oktober is a Norwegian publishing house. Oktober focuses on Norwegian contemporary fiction. In addition, they publish a small selection of non-fiction, poetry, and translated fiction. Annually they release around 50 new titles, and around 150 Norwegian authors are attached to the publishing house.

It was established in 1970 by members of SUF (m-l), the former youth league of the Socialist People's Party and later youth league of the Workers' Communist Party. It has been owned by Aschehoug since 1992, and its chief executive officer is Geir Berdahl. The publishing house formerly also used to run a book retailer chain called "Oktober Bokhandel".

Characteristic authorships that Oktober has nourished through the years are Dag Solstad, Jon Michelet, Kjell Askildsen, Gunnar Wærness, and Edvard Hoem. When chief editor (and author) Geir Gulliksen switched from Tiden Norsk Forlag to Oktober in May 2001, he brought along several young authors, amongst them Karl Ove Knausgård and Tore Renberg.

References

1970 establishments in Norway
Publishing companies established in 1970
Publishing companies of Norway
Companies based in Oslo

External links 
 Oktober.no
 Dagbladet.no Startet med Lenin og Mao, endte opp med Knausgård Summary on the history and development of the publishing house 25.10.2010